Fuchsia is a genus of gelechioid moths and only genus of the Fuchsiini tribe. In some systematic layouts, it is placed in the subfamily Amphisbatinae of the concealer moth family (Oecophoridae). Delimitation of Amphisbatinae versus the closely related Depressariidae and Oecophorinae is a major problem of Gelechioidea taxonomy and systematics, and most authors separate the former two as full-blown families (Amphisbatidae and Depressariidae), and/or include the Amphisbatinae in Depressariidae, or merge them in the Oecophorinae outright.

Species
Species of Fuchsia include:
Fuchsia huertasi Vives, 1995
Fuchsia luteella (Heinemann, 1870)

Footnotes

References
 Fauna Europaea (FE) (2009): Fuchsia. Version 2.1, 2009-DEC-22. Retrieved 2012-JAN-27.
 Pitkin, Brian & Jenkins, Paul (2004): Butterflies and Moths of the World, Generic Names and their Type-species – Fuchsia. Version of 2004-NOV-05. Retrieved 2012-JAN-27.
 Savela, Markku (2001): Markku Savela's Lepidoptera and some other life forms – Fuchsia. Version of 2001-NOV-08. Retrieved 2012-JAN-27.

Depressariinae